Pleasant Riggs Crump (December 23, 1847 – December 31, 1951) was an American soldier who was the last verifiable veteran who fought for the Confederacy during the American Civil War. Although he was survived by several other claimants in the 1950s, such as William Lundy, John B. Salling and Walter Williams, historical research has subsequently debunked these claims. Crump officially remains the last surviving veteran of the Confederate States Army.

Life and career
Born in Crawford's Cove, St. Clair County, Alabama, Crump and a friend left home and traveled to Petersburg, Virginia, where Crump enlisted as a private in the 10th Alabama Infantry Regiment in November 1864. Assigned to Company A, Crump saw action at the Battle of Hatcher's Run, and participated in the siege of Petersburg before witnessing General Robert E. Lee's surrender at Appomattox Court House to Union General Ulysses S. Grant. 

Returning home to rural Alabama, Crump soon relocated to Lincoln, in nearby Talladega County. There, at the age of 22, he married a local woman named Mary Hall. They had five children from their marriage, which lasted until she died on December 31, 1901. Crump later married Ella Wallis of Childersburg in 1905. After her death in July 1942, he lived with a grandson's family. 

The United Confederate Veterans awarded Crump the honorary title of colonel in its organization. In 1950, he met with 98-year-old "General" James Moore, who was recognized as the only other Confederate veteran remaining in Alabama. 

Crump died shortly after his 104th birthday, exactly fifty years after his first wife, Mary Hall died. He is buried in Hall Cemetery, in Lincoln.

See also
 Albert Woolson
 Last surviving United States war veterans

References
Notes 

Further reading
 Linedecker, Clifford L., ed. Civil War, A-Z: The Complete Handbook of America's Bloodiest Conflict, New York City, Ballantine Books, 2002. 
 Hoar, Jay S., The South's Last Boys in Gray: An Epic Prose Elegy, Bowling Green State University Popular Press, 1976, pp. 463–466.

External links
 

1847 births
1951 deaths
American centenarians
Men centenarians
Confederate States Army soldiers
People from St. Clair County, Alabama
People of Alabama in the American Civil War